Events in the year 2016 in Liechtenstein.

Incumbents 
 Prince: Hans-Adam II
 Regent: Alois
 Prime Minister: Adrian Hasler

Events 

 5–21 August – Liechtenstein at the 2016 Summer Olympics: 3 competitors in 2 sports (swimming and tennis).
 18 September – A referendum on amendments to the Family Allowances Act was held, with the outcome that the amendments were rejected by 82% of voters.

Deaths

See also 

 2016 in Europe
 City states

References 

 
2010s in Liechtenstein
Years of the 21st century in Liechtenstein
Liechtenstein
Liechtenstein